Cut Tari Aminah Anasya (born 1 November 1977) is an Indonesian soap opera actress, model, and presenter of Aceh-West Sumatera descent.

Career
Her acting career began when she was invited by Harry de Fretes to guest star in the comedy soap opera Dongeng Langit. She then got an offer to appear in Sisi-Sisi Dunia in a supporting role. She has also appeared in the soap operas Perjalanan, Melati, Doaku Harapanku, Kafe Biru, Dewi Fortuna, Tersanjung, and Rosalinda.

Personal life
Cut Tari Aminah Anasya was born on 1 November 1977, in Jakarta. She is the third child of four siblings of Teuku Joesransjah. She graduated in Stamford College, Jakarta. She married Johannes Yusuf Subrata on 9 January 2004 and divorce in 2014. They have one daughter named Sydney, born on 10 October 2007.

Five years being single, Cut Tari married with Richard Kevin on 12 December 2019 in Jakarta.

Sex tape scandal
Tari was the subject of gossip in 2010 when a pornographic video of her with Ariel was posted online. The event was widely covered in newspapers in Indonesia and several foreign countries. She lost her job as infotainment host of the show Insert on Trans TV. At first she insisted it was not her in the video, but later said it was indeed her. She had not known of the existence of the video before it started to circulate. Her husband, Johannes Yusuf Subrata, initially remained firm and even proud of her courage, and said that he would not divorce her. They eventually did divorce, in 2014.

After a hiatus of more than a year, Tari began co-hosting the talk show Friends with Indra Herlambang and Uli Herdinansyah, who had been fellow announcers on the show Insert. Tari returned to host the show Insert in 2013.

Filmography

Television

TV commercials
 Pixy
 Belia
 Mie Sedaap
 Kentucky Fried Chicken
 AC Sayonara Sharp

Awards and nominations

References

External links
 Profile and news at KapanLagi.com

1977 births
Living people
Acehnese people
Actresses from Jakarta
Indonesian female models
Indonesian television actresses